David Gordon (born April 7, 1948) is an American libertarian philosopher and intellectual historian influenced by Rothbardian views of economics. Peter J. Boettke, in his Reason Foundation "Reason Papers," Issue No. 19, Fall 1994, describes Gordon as "a philosopher and intellectual historian who is deeply influenced by the Rothbardian strand of economics." He is a senior fellow at the Ludwig von Mises Institute and editor of The Mises Review.

Education
Gordon received degrees from University of California Los Angeles, including a doctorate in intellectual history. He became a specialist on Murray Rothbards' beliefs of political theory, history, economics, and other subjects.

Career

In 1985 Gordon worked with professor Walter Block on a law review article entitled, "Extortion and the Exercise of Free Speech Rights," which explores contradictions and paradoxes in-laws against blackmail and the conditions under which such laws are acceptable.Walter Block and David Gordon, "Extortion and the Exercise of Free Speech Rights: A Reply to Professors Posner, Epstein, Nozick and Lindgren," Loyola of Los Angeles Law Review, 19, no. 1, November 1985, pp. 37–54.

He has contributed to scholarly publications such as Analysis, International Philosophical Quarterly, The Journal of Libertarian Studies, The Quarterly Journal of Austrian Economics, Social Philosophy and Policy and Econ Journal Watch.

He also has been published in the Orange County Register, The American Conservative and The Freeman.

Gordon’s 1991 book Resurrecting Marx: The Analytical Marxists on Freedom, Exploitation, and Justice was described by Mises Institute scholar Yuri Maltsev as "a refutation of neo-Marxist attempts to save the system from itself." The book, which answers the arguments of Marxist political philosophers, including G. A. Cohen, Jon Elster , and John Roemer, dismisses every form of Marxism as theoretically unviable. The American Political Science Review said Gordon's argument was "rather crude": capitalism could not be exploitative, and laissez-faire capitalism could serve a just world. Therefore, Gordon concludes, Marxism is "a complete failure." Contemporary Sociology said Gordon failed to show that analytical Marxists were "a formidable weapon in the hands of anti-Marxists" such as himself. Gordon was said to have shown little competency in anti-Marxist argument, falling into "easily avoided mistakes."The Review of Metaphysics assessed the book more positively, describing how Gordon successfully accomplished his explicit goal of demonstrating how Cohen, Elster and Roemer had failed to "rehabilitate Marx's economic theories". The review said that Gordon's book suggested an unstated second goal, that of Gordon justifying his own libertarian stance, and that this portion of the book was "by far the most stimulating." Oxford political scientist David Leopold noted Gordon's thumbnail test regarding whether a writer could be classified as an analytical Marxist as part of a common "misleading and unfortunate" understanding of the school, Gordon writing that a favorable stance on dialectics meant that the writer must be "crossed off the list."

Gordon's book The Philosophical Origins of Austrian Economics (1992), which explores the philosophical origins of Carl Menger’s economic theories, was highly praised by Murray Rothbard. Writing in The Review of Austrian Economics, Barry Smith criticized the book for its over-simplistic division of philosophers into two camps—German (Hegelian, organicist and anti-science) and Austrian (Aristotelian, individualist and pro-science)—despite the philosophers having more complex interrelations. For instance Franz Brentano is exemplary of Austrian thought though he was born in Germany and was strongly influenced by German philosopher Friedrich Adolf Trendelenburg. Gordon later wrote an essay, "Second Thoughts on The Philosophical Origins of Austrian Economics," to provide some additions and corrections to his book.

Gordon edited the collection, Secession, State & Liberty (2002), eleven essays that suggest that secession should be given serious consideration. The essays examine United States history, look at theoretical issues, and apply theory to the modern world.

In 2011 Gordon conducted a study with Swedish consultant Per Nilsson on books published by Harvard University Press. They published the results of their analysis as "The Ideological Profile of Harvard University Press: Categorizing 494 Books Published 2000–2010" in Econ Journal Watch. They presented a spreadsheet analysis that classified the books by unknown criteria, concluding the issue was not that Harvard press "is ideological, but that its ideology is predominately leftist." The authors acknowledged they had not read all the books they classified. A reviewer noted that one author did not consider his book "leftist," and that the reason other books were so characterized was not clear.Nina Ayoub, "Harvard Press Leans Left, Economists Say", Chronicle of Higher Education, January 25, 2011.

Assessments

Murray Rothbard described Gordon as a friend and "Mr. Erudition." In Hans-Hermann Hoppe's The Myth of National Defense, Luigi Marco Bassani and Carlo Lottieri described Gordon as the "semiofficial reviewer of the libertarian community." Journalist Brian Doherty, in his foreword to Rothbard's Strictly Confidential (2010), writes that Gordon is "the only man around who knows as much as Rothbard did when it comes to the historical, philosophical and economic background of libertarianism." The Orange Country Register in an editorial described Gordon as a "polymath."

Books
 
 Editor, with Jeremy Shearmur. H. B. Acton's The Morals of Markets and Related Essays'', (1971) essays. 2nd edition (1993), Liberty Fund, 
 
 
 Editor,

References

External links
 David Gordon archives at LewRockwell.com
 2010 Mises Faculty Spotlight: Text Interview with David Gordon
 2012 Bad Quaker Podcast: Audio Interview with David Gordon

1948 births
Living people
20th-century American philosophers
21st-century American economists
21st-century American philosophers
American libertarians
American political philosophers
Austrian School economists
Economic historians
Historians of economic thought
Intellectual historians
Libertarian historians
Mises Institute people
Place of birth missing (living people)
University of California, Los Angeles alumni